Hymenobacter algoricola is a species of bacteria first isolated from Victoria Upper Glacier, Antarctica on basal ice. It is a psychrotolerant, heterotrophic aerobe. It is notable for the prevalence of horizontal gene transfers in its evolution, possibly due to dormancy because of its habitat.

References

Further reading
Reddy, Gundlapally SN, and Ferran Garcia-Pichel. "Description of Hymenobacter arizonensis sp. nov. from the southwestern arid lands of the United States of America." Antonie van Leeuwenhoek 103.2 (2013): 321–330.
magna Bryantseva, Ectothiorhodospira. "List of new names and new combinations previously effectively, but not validly, published." Strain 8: 7.
Lee, Jae-Jin, et al. "Hymenobacter swuensis sp. nov., a gamma-radiation-resistant bacteria isolated from mountain soil." Current Microbiology 68.3 (2014): 305–310.
Han, Lu, et al. "Hymenobacter qilianensis sp. nov., isolated from a subsurface sandstone sediment in the permafrost region of Qilian Mountains, China and emended description of the genus Hymenobacter." Antonie van Leeuwenhoek105.5 (2014): 971–978.

External links

LPSN

algoricola
Bacteria described in 2011